Johannes Maria Trilaksyanta Pujasumarta (27 December 1949 in Surakarta - 10 November 2015 in Semarang) was a Roman Catholic archbishop.

Ordained to the priesthood in 1977, Pujasumarta was named bishop of the Roman Catholic Diocese of Bandung, Indonesia in 2008. In 2010, he was named archbishop of the Roman Catholic Archdiocese of Semarang; Pujasumarta died while still in office.

Notes

1949 births
2015 deaths
Indonesian Roman Catholic archbishops
Pontifical University of Saint Thomas Aquinas alumni
People from Surakarta